Tuckercon, also known as Archon31, was the ninth North American Science Fiction Convention, held in Collinsville, Illinois, on August 2–5, 2007, at the Gateway Center and Collinsville Holiday Inn.  Collinsville is just across the Mississippi River from St Louis, Missouri.  This NASFiC was held because Yokohama, Japan, was selected as the location for the 2007 Worldcon.

Tuckercon was dedicated to the memory of Wilson "Bob" Tucker. The convention is also 31st in the series of St. Louis-area conventions known as Archon.

Guests of honor
Barry & Sally Childs-Helton, Filk
Bill Corbett, Media
Elizabeth Covey, Costuming
James Ernest of Cheapass Games, Gaming
Barbara Hambly, Featured
Richard Hatch, Last-Minute Special
Nancy "Cleo" Hathaway, Fan
Vic Milan, Masquerade MC
Kevin Murphy, Media
Darrell K. Sweet, Artist
Roger Tener, Toastmaster
Lani Tupu, Media/Workshop

Kevin Murphy and Bill Corbett replaced Media guest Mira Furlan who was unable to attend.

Information

Site selection
After "Nippon in 2007" was selected over the Columbus, Ohio bid as the World Science Fiction Convention to be held in 2007 (as "Nippon 2007" in The Hague), the WSFS Business Meeting directed that a written ballot election be held at Cascadia Con, the then-upcoming 2005 NASFiC in Seattle, Washington, to select a NASFiC site for 2007.  The St. Louis bid, originally unopposed, defeated a write-in campaign by a San Jose, California bid with 111 of the 161 votes cast.

Committee
Co-Chair: Steve Norris
Co-Chair: Michelle Zellich
Art Show: Susan Bolhafner
Charity & Other Auctions: Mike Hatley
Children's Programming: Steve Bolhafner
Dealers Room: Jill Lybarger
Filking: Gary Hanak
Gaming: Jon Bancroft
Hospitality Room: Dennis Kleine
Logistics: Sean Sendlein
Masquerade: Sheila Lenkman, Scott Corwin
Program Book & Progress Reports: John Sies
Programming: Michelle Zellich
Registration: Maureen Davis
Special Events: John Mitchell
Treasurer: Lucinda Gille-Rowley
Video Rooms: David Schuey
Volunteers: Jason Halbert
Webmaster: Rich Zellich

Events
The Sidewise Awards for Alternate History were presented to Gardner Dozois for his story "Counterfactual" and to Charles Stross for the first three novels in his The Merchant Princes series.

Notable program participants
Robin Wayne Bailey, Peter S. Beagle, Peter Bradley, Rachel Caine, Eric Flint, Laurell K. Hamilton, Jacqueline Lichtenberg, Lee Martindale, Jack McDevitt, Elizabeth Moon, Jody Lynn Nye, Hank Reinhardt, Selina Rosen, Steven H Silver, The Great Luke Ski, Tom Smith, Toni Weisskopf, Gene Wolfe

See also
 World Science Fiction Society

References

External links
Tuckercon/Archon31 website
NASFiC Official Site

North American Science Fiction Convention
Festivals in Illinois
Culture of St. Louis
2007 in the United States
2007 in Illinois